Bryan Bryll Cruz Termulo (born March 8, 1988) is a Filipino actor and award winning singer-songwriter, who was the runner-up in Pinoy Pop Superstar Year 3. He is best known for singing the theme song of Filipino TV series Walang Hanggan entitled Dadalhin and 100 Days to Heaven's Bihag.  He then gained the title  "Prince of Teleserye Themesongs".

Early life
Termulo was born on March 8, 1988, in Bocaue, Bulacan, the third child among four of Benigno Termulo of Bulacan and Ruth Cruz of Bagbag, Bauang, La Union. Yan, as he is fondly called, is very simple yet promising, vigorous and young at heart. He earned his high school diploma from Pulong Buhangin National High School in Santa Maria, Bulacan.

Career
After his journey in Pinoy Pop Superstar Year 3 in GMA Network in 2007, he also earned a silver medal in World Championships of Performing Arts (WCOPA).  Bryan released his first album in 2010 entitled Begin. In December of the same year, Bryan's elder brother succumbed to Dengue. Despite of sorrow, Bryan decided to pursue living and fulfilling his dreams. He pursue his college education and took up Mass Communication and later shifted to Communication Arts. As part of his career move, he moved to ABS-CBN and became a part of Star Magic and was chosen to be a part of all boy group Boys R Boys. In 2012, Bryan released his second album Hanggang Ngayon. Bryan has released digital recordings under Warner music he released his first single "Mundong Imposible" with "Maris Racal" as her leading lady on the video. Bryan recorded also the song "I Can't Fight This Feeling" which originally song by Reo Speed Wagon. Then, he switched to "Ivory Music" and he was able to record Original Filipino Music "OPM" streamed in various digital platforms. "Agwat" has reached 1.2 million streams on Spotify. And thereafter "Taguan" as his second single on same recording label.

Bryan XXV
In 2013, just a day after Bryan's 25th birthday, his first major concert took place at Music Museum entitled BRYAN XXV. With guest performers Khen Magat, Bugoy Drilon, Angeline Quinto and KZ Tandingan.

Discography

Albums

Television theme Song

Digital Release

Filmography

Television

References

Filipino pop singers
Singers from Bulacan
1988 births
Living people
21st-century Filipino male singers
Participants in Philippine reality television series
GMA Network personalities
ABS-CBN personalities
Star Music artists
Star Magic